The Monastery of San Juan de Duero (Spanish: Monasterio de San Juan de Duero) is a ruined, medieval monastery located in Soria, Spain. It belonged to the Knights Hospitaller.

The building has been protected since 1882 and is a Bien de Interés Cultural.

Monasteries in Castile and León
Bien de Interés Cultural landmarks in the Province of Soria
Tourist attractions in Soria